Vid Belec (born 6 June 1990) is a Slovenian professional footballer who plays as a goalkeeper for Cypriot First Division club APOEL and the Slovenia national team.

Club career

Internazionale
Signed by Internazionale along with Rene Krhin at the age of 16, Belec spent three-and-a-half seasons with Inter Primavera team. In the first season he was a backup for Paolo Tornaghi and won the Primavera Scudetto that season. He also played for Campionato Nazionale Allievi under-17 youth team in the 2006–07 season. In the 2007–08 season, at first he had to compete with Enrico Alfonso for the starting place in Primavera team until Alfonso left the club in January 2008. He then became the fourth keeper of Inter's first team and the first choice in Primavera, which won the 2008 Torneo di Viareggio and finished as the league runners-up. Under José Mourinho, Belec was promoted to the senior team and made his first team debut on 17 July 2009, in a pre-season friendly. He also played at the World Football Challenge.

In November 2009, he signed a reported five-year contract with the club.

Crotone
On 6 July 2010, Belec completed a loan to Serie B club Crotone. He made his debut on 4 September 2010 after the first-choice keeper Emanuele Concetti was not available. He then became the starting goalkeeper ahead of Concetti since round 18.

However, in the 2011–12 Serie B season, his former Inter teammate Giacomo Bindi took the starting place from round 2 to 4, and again since round 10. However, after a 3–0 defeat to Brescia, Belec re-took the starting place in January 2012.

Return to Internazionale
Belec returned to Inter during the summer 2012 window after his loan deal to Crotone expired. He was kept as a third choice keeper behind Samir Handanović and Luca Castellazzi. He made his first team debut on 30 August as a substitute in a UEFA Europa League game against FC Vaslui to replace Antonio Cassano after starting goalkeeper Castellazzi was sent off.

Olhanense 
On 15 July 2013, Belec completed a loan to Olhanense, from the Portuguese Primeira Liga.

Konyaspor
On 1 September 2014, Belec was signed by Konyaspor in a temporary deal. On 2 February 2015 the loan was terminated.

Carpi
In summer 2015, Belec terminated his contract with Internazionale. On 31 August 2015, he signed with Carpi F.C. 1909 for one season. He made his debut in Serie A in a win against Torino on 10 October 2015. After debut he became a regular starter in first eleven for Carpi. On 30 May 2016, he signed a new two-year deal with Carpi.

Benevento
In July 2017, Belec signed a three-year contract with Serie A side Benevento.

APOEL
On 23 June 2019, Belec joined APOEL on loan with an obligation to buy after two seasons.

Salernitana
On 25 September 2020, he moved to Serie B club Salernitana.

Return to APOEL
On 27 June 2022, Belec returned to APOEL on a three-year deal.

International career
Belec received a call-up to 2009 UEFA European Under-19 Football Championship elite qualification. He was the first choice in 2008 and 2009 UEFA European Under-19 Football Championship qualification.

Belec received a call-up to Slovenia national under-21 football team in September 2010, he was the backup of Jan Koprivec. On 1 October, he received another call-up against Hungary, which the team was composed with players that eligible to 2013 UEFA European Under-21 Football Championship (born 1990 or after).  However he did not play that match.

He received a call-up from the senior team in February 2011, after the injury of Samir Handanović, for a friendly match against Albania.

References

External links

Football.it profile 
NZS profile 

1990 births
Living people
Sportspeople from Maribor
Slovenian footballers
Association football goalkeepers
Slovenian expatriate footballers
Slovenia youth international footballers
Slovenia international footballers
Inter Milan players
F.C. Crotone players
S.C. Olhanense players
Konyaspor footballers
A.C. Carpi players
Benevento Calcio players
U.C. Sampdoria players
APOEL FC players
U.S. Salernitana 1919 players
Serie B players
Primeira Liga players
Süper Lig players
Serie A players
Cypriot First Division players
Slovenian expatriate sportspeople in Italy
Expatriate footballers in Italy
Slovenian expatriate sportspeople in Portugal
Expatriate footballers in Portugal
Slovenian expatriate sportspeople in Turkey
Expatriate footballers in Turkey
Slovenian expatriate sportspeople in Cyprus
Expatriate footballers in Cyprus